Itsye Mordkhe Schaechter (December 1, 1927 – February 15, 2007) was a leading Yiddish linguist, writer, and educator who spent a lifetime studying, standardizing and teaching the language. 

Schaechter, whose passion for Yiddish dated to his boyhood in Romania, dedicated his life to reclaiming Yiddish as a living language for the descendants of its first speakers, the Ashkenazic Jewry of central and eastern Europe. He was also the third editor of Afn Shvel (1957–2004), a Yiddish magazine.

In Europe
He was born Itsye Mordkhe Schaechter in the then-Romanian town of Czernowitz (in German and Yiddish; known in Romanian as Cernăuţi, and in Ukrainian as Chernivtsi). His father was a businessman. Schaechter became fascinated with Yiddish as a student, and he decided to study linguistics at the University of Bucharest.  He earned his doctorate in Linguistics at the University of Vienna in 1951.

From 1947 to 1951, Schaechter lived in the Arzbergerstrasse Displaced persons (DP) camp in Vienna. During this period he worked for the YIVO Institute for Jewish Research, as a zamler, or collector, for the YIVO Archives.

In the United States
When Schaechter came to the United States in 1951, he served in military intelligence in the United States Army during the Korean War.  Following this, he resumed his association with YIVO and began teaching and writing. He continued his work as a bibliographer and proofreader (1954–1956), and then, from the 1970s until 1986, he was a bibliographer, proofreader, and finally editor of YIVO's Yiddishe Shprakh, a journal devoted to the pronunciation, grammar and vocabulary of Standard Yiddish.  He also founded the Committee for the Implementation of the Standardized Yiddish Orthography in 1958.

From 1981 until his retirement in 1993, he was Senior Lecturer in Yiddish Studies at Columbia University in New York. Besides this, he also taught Yiddish language in the intensive Uriel Weinreich Program in Yiddish Language, Literature & Culture, a joint project of YIVO and Columbia University, since its inception in 1968 until 2002. He has also taught Yiddish courses at the Jewish Theological Seminary of America (1960–1962), Jewish Teacher's Seminary-Herzliah (1962–1978) and Yeshiva University (1968–1973) and has instructed many distinguished scholars and professors of Yiddish language, literature and Jewish history throughout the world.

In the 1980s, he was associate editor of The Great Dictionary of the Yiddish Language and, from 1961 to 1972, he was associate editor of The Language and Culture Atlas of Ashkenazic Jewry.

Achievements
Schaechter received the Itzik Manger Prize, the most prestigious Yiddish literary award, in 1994; the Khayim Zhitlowsky Award in 1984; and the Osher Schuchinsky Award from the World Congress for Jewish Culture in 1986.

His achievements in the cultural sphere are no less impressive than those in the literary or academic sphere. He was the founder of the League for Yiddish and served as its executive director from the inception of the organization in 1979 until his retirement in 2004. In 1964 he founded Yugntruf – Youth for Yiddish together with several of his students, and he served as its official advisor until 1974. Following his death, his daughter Gitl Schaechter-Viswanath and former student and colleague Paul Glasser published the Comprehensive English Yiddish Dictionary based on his lexical research.

Family
The entire Schaechter-Gottesman family has been very productive in the field of Yiddish culture. His mother, Lifshe Schaechter-Widman, wrote a memoir, Durkhgelebt a Velt (A Full Life) in 1973, and served as a resource for folksong researchers with her recording Az Di Furst Avek (When You Go Away). His sister, Beyle Schaechter-Gottesman, a Yiddish poet and songwriter, published books together with Charne Schaechter, her sister-in-law.  Schaechter′s daughter, Gitl Schaechter-Viswanath is also a Yiddish poet; his son Binyumen (Ben) Schaechter is a composer and musical director in Yiddish and English; daughter Rukhl Schaechter is the editor of the Yiddish Forward; daughter Eydl Reznik teaches Yiddish among the ultra-Orthodox community in Tsfat, Israel.  His nephew, Itzik Gottesman, is an contributor to The Forward and the online journal In Geveb, and a scholar of Yiddish folklore. His grandson, Naftali Schaechter Ejdelman, helped found Yiddish Farm, an organization that facilitates Yiddish-immersion programs on an organic farm in Goshen, NY. All sixteen of his grandchildren speak and read Yiddish fluently.

Death
He died on February 15, 2007, after a long illness following a stroke in the summer of 2001.

Publications
Di Geviksn-Velt in Yidish ["Plant Names in Yiddish: A Handbook of Botanical Terminology"]. New York: League for Yiddish/YIVO Institute for Jewish Research, 2005.
Yiddish II: An Intermediate and Advanced Textbook. Fourth Edition. New York: League for Yiddish, 2004.
Fun Folkshprakh tsu Kulturshprakh [The History of the Standardized Yiddish Spelling], New York: League for Yiddish/YIVO, 1999.
Kurs Fun Yidisher Ortografye [A Course of the Yiddish Orthography], 4th ed. New York: League for Yiddish, 1996.
Trogn, Hobn un Friyike Kinder-yorn [Pregnancy, Childbirth and Early Childhood]. New York: League for Yiddish, 1991.
Eynglish-Yidish Verterbikhl Fun Akademisher Terminologye [English-Yiddish Dictionary of Academic Terminology]. New York: League for Yiddish, 1988.
Laytish Mame-Loshn [Authentic Yiddish]. New York: League for Yiddish, 1986.
Mit A Gutn Apetit! Reshime Gastronomishe Terminen Bon Appétit! [Yiddish Gastronomic Terminology]. New York-Hamden-Philadelphia: Foundation for a Living Yiddish, 1976.
Elyokum Tsunzers Verk: Kritishe Oysgabe, [The Works of Elyokum Zunser: A critical edition]. New York: YIVO Institute for Jewish Research, [2 volumes], 1964.
Guide to the Standardized Yiddish Orthography. YIVO, 1961.
Aktionen im Jiddischen: Ein sprachwissenschaftlicher Beitrag zur Bedeutungslehre des Verbums. Phil. Diss. Vienna 1951.

References 

 League for Yiddish website
 Schaechter's library has been donated to the Eisenhower Library, Johns Hopkins University.  Books are listed in the library's catalog as "Gift of From the collection of Dr. Mordkhe and Charne Schaechter".

Romanian Ashkenazi Jews
Romanian emigrants to the United States
American people of Austrian-Jewish descent
American people of Romanian-Jewish descent
Bukovina Jews
Writers from Chernivtsi
Linguists of Yiddish
History of YIVO
1927 births
2007 deaths
Itzik Manger Prize recipients